Jennifer Palm Lundberg (born April 28, 1986, in Sigtuna, Stockholm County, Sweden) is Miss World Sweden 2008 and represented Sweden in Miss World 2008, in Johannesburg, South Africa.

Biography
Lundberg placed third runner-up in the Miss World Sweden pageant, but claimed the title when the original winner, Amanda Ulfdotter, was fired and the first and second runners-up declined the crown after arguments over the winning contract.

Lundberg decided during her reign as Miss World Sweden to work with charities concerning anorexia nervosa and bulimia with plans to help the Swedish Animal Protection Service.

She speaks Swedish, English, Norwegian and Spanish.

References

External links
 Miss World Sweden Official Page
 Miss World Official Page
Jennifers Blogg Page

1986 births
Living people
People from Sigtuna Municipality
Miss World 2008 delegates
Swedish female models
Beauty pageant controversies
Swedish beauty pageant winners